Coltău is a commune in Maramureș County, Romania. It is composed of two villages, Cătălina (Koltókatalin) and Coltău. Formerly independent, the villages were part of Săcălășeni Commune from 1968 to 2004, when they were split off to form a separate commune.

At the 2011 census, 57.1% of inhabitants were Hungarians, 37.8% Roma and 5% Romanians.

References

Communes in Maramureș County